Madhavaram, is a village in Prakasam district in the state of Andhra Pradesh in India.

Demographics

References 

Towns in Prakasam district